Diplazium fraxinifolium is a species of fern in the family Athyriaceae. It is found from India through Malesia to New Guinea.

References 

Plants described in 1841
fraxinifolium